This is a list of hospitals in Ponce, Puerto Rico. Both, public and private hospitals are listed. General as well as specialized hospitals are listed.

Hospital list summary table
The following table lists hospitals by their year of founding, that is, their year of opening. A listing sorted by any of the other fields can be obtained by clicking on the header of the field. For example, clicking on "Barrio" will sort hospitals by their barrio location.

Key:
Av. = Avenida (avenue)
C. = Calle (street)
NB = Northbound
SB = Southbound
WB = Westbound
EB = Eastbound
Unk = Unknown
N/A = Not applicable

See also

 List of hospitals in Puerto Rico

Notes

References

Hospitals, Ponce
Hospitals in Ponce, Puerto Rico
hospitals
Ponce